The Hamilton Kerr Institute is a branch of the Fitzwilliam Museum in Cambridgeshire, England, dedicated to the study and conservation of easel paintings. It is also part of the University of Cambridge.

Facilities and logistics 
The institute was founded in 1976 through grants from the Baring Foundation, the Esmée Fairbairn Trust, the Gulbenkian Foundation, the Isaac Wolfson Foundation, the Monument Trust, and the Pilgrim Trust, and continues to finance itself through income from its work and its endowment fund. It is housed in a riverside property, donated by Hamilton Kerr, seven miles south of Cambridge in the village of Whittlesford. The premises consist of a mid-eighteenth century house and converted mill buildings, containing offices and a scientific laboratory, restoration studios, studios for panel treatment and the relining of canvases, and studios for photography. In 1980, the institute opened a studio in London.

Notable restoration accomplishments 
The Westminster Retable: 1998–2004. The Westminster Retable of ca. 1270 was the main altarpiece for Westminster Abbey during pre-Reformation England. When it was rediscovered in the 18th century, several poorly executed restoration attempts damaged the retable. In 1998, the institute acquired this work, and began work on repairing and restoring it.
The Thornham Parva Retable. This 15-ft long medieval altarpiece was restored after an eight-year plan. Estimated to be worth millions, the altarpiece is thought to have been created in the 1330s for a Dominican Priory in Norfolk. It now stands in a protective glass case in St Mary's Church, Thornham Parva.

List of major donors 
The following have made donations:

 Council for the Care of Churches
 J. Paul Getty Trust
 Idlewild Trust
 Samuel H. Kress Foundation
 Paul Mellon Centre
 Queen Elizabeth Scholarship Trust
 Rayne Foundation
 Woodmansterne Publications Ltd
 Worshipful Company of Painter-Stainers
 National Association of Decorative and Fine Arts Societies

References

External links

Organizations established in 1976
Fitzwilliam Museum
Organisations based in Cambridgeshire
Conservation and restoration companies
1976 in art
1976 establishments in England